Nouveau Flamenco is the title of Ottmar Liebert's first album, released in May 1990, written in a subgenre of flamenco known as new flamenco, fusing pop music forms and call-response structure together with flamenco elements.

A digitally remastered edition entitled  Nouveau Flamenco: 1990-2000 Special Tenth Anniversary Edition was released in 2000.

Track listing

Production
Produced By Ottmar Liebert & Randy Rand
Engineered By Randy Rand & Tim Stroh
Mastered By William Aura
Executive Producer: Matt Marshall

Personnel
Ottmar Liebert: Guitars
Stefan Liebert: Keyboards
Jon Gagan: Bass
Jeff Sussmann: Drums, Percussion

Sales and certifications

See also
 List of best-selling Latin albums

References

1990 debut albums
New flamenco
Ottmar Liebert albums
Higher Octave albums